The Plutellidae are a family of moths commonly known as the diamondback moths, named after the diamondback moth (Plutella xylostella) of European origin. It was once considered to have three subfamilies: Plutellinae, Praydinae, and Scythropiinae. Praydinae was later elevated to its own family, Praydidae, while Scythropiinae has variously been moved to Yponomeutidae or also elevated to its own family.

Characteristics
The head usually bears smooth scales and the antennae are often thickened in the middle. The wings are elongated and the hindwings often bear long fringes. The forewings often appear to be sickle-shaped because of the arrangement of the fringes. The colouring is generally drab, with various banding and marking. The adults are mostly nocturnal or crepuscular. The larvae feed on the surfaces of leaves which they skeletonise. The host plants vary, but many are in the family Brassicaceae. Some species are economic pests, especially Plutella xylostella.

Genera
Below are the genera of the family Plutellidae:

Angoonopteryx Moriuti, 1983
Anthonympha Moriuti, 1971
Araeolepia Walsingham, 1881
Arrhetopista Meyrick, 1936
Automachaeris Meyrick, 1907
Baerenschenkia Mey, 2011
Bahrlutia Amsel, 1935
Cadmogenes Meyrick, 1923
Calliathla Meyrick, 1931
Charitoleuca Meyrick, 1938
Charixena Meyrick, 1920
Chrysorthenches Dugdale, 1996
Circoxena Meyrick, 1916
Conopotarsa Meyrick, 1913
Deryaxenistis Mey, 2011
Diastatica Meyrick, 1938
Diathryptica Meyrick, 1907
Dieda Diakonoff, 1955
Dolichernis Meyrick, 1891
Doxophyrtis Meyrick, 1914
Eidophasia Stephens, 1842
Embryonopsis Eaton, 1875
Endozestis Meyrick, 1933
Eudolichura Clarke, 1965
Genostele Walsingham, 1900
Gypsosaris Meyrick, 1909
Helenodes Meyrick, 1913
Hyperxena Meyrick, 1882
Lepocnemis Meyrick, 1913
Leuroperna Clarke, 1965
Leuroptila Turner, 1923
Lunakia Klimesch, 1941
Melitonympha Meyrick, 1927
Niphodidactis Meyrick, 1938
Orthenches Meyrick, 1885
Orthiostola Meyrick, 1927
Paraxenistis Meyrick, 1919
Phalangitis Meyrick, 1907
Philaustera Meyrick, 1927
Phylacodes Meyrick, 1905
Pliniaca Busck, 1907
Plutella Schrank, 1802
Plutellites Kozlov, 1988
Plutelloptera Baraniak, 2007
Proditrix Dugdale, 1987
Protosynaema Meyrick, 1885
Psychromnestra Meyrick, 1924
Rhigognostis Zeller, 1857
Scaeophanes Meyrick, 1932
Spyridarcha Meyrick, 1913
Stachyotis Meyrick, 1905
Subeidophasia Weber, 1938
Tonza Walker, 1864
Tritymba Lower, 1894
Zarcinia Chretien, 1915

Excluded genera and species
The fungus moth Erechthias niphochrysa was also once included here, as a distinct genus Acrocenotes.

The family Acrolepiidae (including the genera Acrolepia, Acrolepiopsis, and Digitivalva) is sometimes included in the Plutellidae.

References

 , 2011: New and little known species of Lepidoptera of southwestern Africa. Esperiana Buchreihe zur Entomologie Memoir 6: 146-261.
 , 2012: Phrealcia steueri n. sp. und P. friesei n. sp. - zwei neue Arten einer disjunkt verbreiteten Gattung (Lepidoptera, Ypsolophidae). Entomologische Nachrichten und Berichte 56:53- 57.
 . Butterflies and Moths of the World: Generic Names and their Type-species. Natural History Museum..
 , 2012: Catalogue of the type specimens of Yponomeutoidea (Lepidoptera) in the collection of the United States National Museum of Natural History. Zootaxa 3573: 1-17. Abstract: .

 
Taxa named by Achille Guenée